The 1978–79 South Pacific cyclone season ran year-round from July 1 to June 30. Tropical cyclone activity in the Southern Hemisphere reaches its peak from mid-February to early March.



Systems

Tropical Cyclone Fay

Severe Tropical Cyclone Gordon

Gordon developed on January 3 and left the basin on January 9.

Tropical Cyclone Henry

Henry existed from January 29 to February 5.

Tropical Storm 11P

This storm moved in the circular path, entering the basin on February 3 and returning to the Australian region on February 6.

Tropical Cyclone Kerry

Tropical Cyclone Kerry has the distinction of being the longest lived cyclone in the Australian region. It formed on February 13, 1979, and caused severe damage in the Solomon Islands. It then tracked across the Coral Sea making landfall near Mackay, Queensland on March 1 and dissipated on March 6. Its lowest pressure was 955hPa.

Tropical Cyclone Leslie

Leslie existed from February 21 to February 23.

Severe Tropical Cyclone Meli

Cyclone Meli struck eastern Fiji on March 25.  The island of Nayau suffered a direct hit and passed close to the islands of Lakeba and Cicia.  Fiji suffered tremendous crop losses as a result of the storm.

On March 27, 1979, Cyclone Meli brushed Fiji at peak intensity, causing substantial damage to the island. At least 50 people were killed by the storm. Cyclone Meli had previously passed through Tuvalu damaging Funafuti atoll.

Tropical Storm 23P

This storm existed from March 30 to April 3.

Seasonal effects 

|-
| Fay ||  || bgcolor=#|Category 2 tropical cyclone || bgcolor=#| || bgcolor=#| || || || ||
|-
| Gordon ||  || bgcolor=#|Category 3 severe tropical cyclone || bgcolor=#| || bgcolor=#| || || || ||
|-
| Henry ||  || bgcolor=#|Category 2 tropical cyclone || bgcolor=#| || bgcolor=#| || || || ||
|-
| Kerry ||  || bgcolor=#|Category 2 tropical cyclone || bgcolor=#| || bgcolor=#| || || || ||
|-
| Leslie ||  || bgcolor=#|Category 2 tropical cyclone || bgcolor=#| || bgcolor=#| || || || ||
|-
| Meli ||  || bgcolor=#|Category 3 severe tropical cyclone || bgcolor=#| || bgcolor=#| || || || ||
|-

See also
Atlantic hurricane seasons: 1978, 1979
Eastern Pacific hurricane seasons: 1978, 1979
Western Pacific typhoon seasons: 1978, 1979
North Indian Ocean cyclone seasons: 1978, 1979

References

External links

 
South Pacific cyclone seasons